Ærø Airport (or Ærø Airfield, internationally also spelt Aeroe)  is an airport located on the Ærø island, in Ærø Municipality, Region of Southern Denmark (Region Syddanmark), Denmark.

Airlines and Destinations
The following airline operate regular scheduled flights at the airport:

Starling Air uses the aircraft Partenavia P.68 (for six passengers).

Facilities

References

External links

 

Airports in Denmark
Buildings and structures in the Region of Southern Denmark
Transport in the Region of Southern Denmark
Ærø